Beltrán Ogilbio Pérez (born October 24, 1981) is a former Major League Baseball pitcher.

Career
In , he signed as a free agent with the Washington Nationals.

After pitching for the Harrisburg Senators, the Nationals' Double-A affiliate in the Eastern League, Pérez made his major league debut on September 2, as a relief pitcher. However, he made his final three appearances of 2006 as a starting pitcher.

In 2007, Pérez again pitched for Harrisburg and also for the Columbus Clippers, Washington's Triple-A affiliate in the International League. He logged 124 innings in 20 starts and two relief appearances, winning 7, losing 7, and recording a 4.57 ERA. In 2008, Pérez once again pitched for Harrisburg, going 3-5 with a 6.41 ERA.

External links

1981 births
Arizona League Diamondbacks players
Columbus Clippers players
Dominican Republic expatriate baseball players in the United States
El Paso Diablos players
Harrisburg Senators players
High Desert Mavericks players
Jacksonville Suns players
Lancaster JetHawks players

Living people
Major League Baseball pitchers
Major League Baseball players from the Dominican Republic
South Bend Silver Hawks players
Vero Beach Dodgers players
Washington Nationals players